The comic book stories published by Marvel Comics since the 1940s have featured several fictional teams and organizations and this page lists them.

0–9

198

A

A-Force

A-Next

A.I. Army
Because of his revelation that he is now a simulated A.I., Tony Stark became Mark One and started to establish the A.I. Army which also consists of Albert, Awesome Android, Egghead II, H.E.R.B.I.E., M-11, Machine Man, Machinesmith, Quasimodo, Super-Adaptoid, Walking Stiletto, the Dreadnoughts, a Sentinel, several Constructo-Bots, several Nick Fury LMDs, and an unnamed bomb disposal robot. This group wants to obtain equal rights with organic beings through whatever way possible.

Acolytes

Action Pack
Action Pack is Kentucky's sanctioned superhero team that's part of the Fifty-State Initiative. Its known members are Vox, Prima Donna, and Frog-Man (who was briefly replaced by a Skrull).

Advanced Idea Mechanics

Advocates Squad

Agents of Atlas

Agents of Fortune

Aladdin

Aladdin Assault Squad

All-New Invaders

All-New X-Factor

All-New X-Men

All-Winners Squad

Alliance of Evil

Alpha Flight

Alpha Flight is Canada's sanctioned superhero team.

Alpha Squadron

America Redeemers
See Squadron Supreme.

Americops
The Keane Industry obtained the equipment of Americop where they copied it and used it to create their own private security force called the Americops.

Anachronauts
The Anachronauts are a group of fictional warriors appearing in American comic books published by Marvel Comics. The characters serve Kang the Conqueror as his personal guard. The Anachronauts were brought together by Kang, after having bested each of them in personal combat and extracting their allegiance to him. They are from various eras and alternate realities that Kang has visited in his journeys. They first appeared in Fantastic Four Annual #25 (1992). Its members are Apocryphus, Deathunt 9000, Raa, Sir Raston, Ssith, Tyndar, and Wildrun.

Ani-Men

Annihilators

Anti-Arach9
The Anti-Arach9 is a supervillain group that was formed by Octavia Vermis and consisted of Aeturnum, Brothers Grimm, Krazy Goat, Lady Bullseye, Los Espadas Gemelas De Toledo, Rose Roché, and Stegron. Each of them came together to take down their mutual enemy Spider-Woman.

A.R.M.O.R.

Army of Evil

Asgardians
See Asgard.

Asgardians of the Galaxy

Askani
See Rachel Summers#Askani

Assassin's Guild

Assembly of Evil
The Assembly of Evil is a supervillain team consisting of Jester, Fenris, Hydro-Man, Rock (who the Leader sent in his place), and the reactivated Hulk Robot. This team was first seen during the "Acts of Vengeance" storyline, where Jester formed this team at Doctor Doom's suggestion to create a group to fight the Avengers. Jester also tried to get Cloak and Dagger to join the team, but failed to.

Astonishing X-Men

Atlanteans

Autobots

Avengers

Avengers A.I.

Avenging Host

B

Bacchae
The Bacchae are a fictional group of woman warrior characters appearing in American comic books published by Marvel Comics. In ancient times Hippolyta and her sisters set about war mongering various lands. In each attack she would steal female children, raising them to be her faithful warriors. This gave rise to the origin of the mythological Amazons. Hippolyta served as their queen and she called them her Bacchae. This arrangement served for many years until the arrival of Hercules. Sometime later with her being immortal, Hippolyta decided to restart her Bacchae cult in order to advance her standing in modern day. She did this by initiating female street people and runaways, providing them with weapons and fighting skills. This modern day Bacchae also became former associates of the Golden Horde and once sought vengeance on the Invisible Woman for interfering with their affairs. They then formed a private New York club called Tartarus as a front based in the heart of Wall Street. Outsiders see it as a private pleasure palace for those of the international business elite who consider the Hellfire Club too passé. It was here during a kidnap attempt that they were foiled by the X-Men.

BAD Girls, Inc.
BAD Girls, Inc. is a group that consists of Black Mamba, the Asp, and Diamondback who were close friends as well as founding members of Sidewinder's super-villain team the Serpent Society. When Diamondback began dating Steve Rogers, the team acted behind the scenes to make sure that her first real date was uneventful. After learning of Diamondback and Cap's relationship, the Society's new leader, King Cobra, had Diamondback kidnapped and placed on trial, fearing that she would reveal the groups secrets to the Captain. Diamondback was found guilty by her fellow serpents and sentenced to execution. Black Mamba and Asp objected but were overruled by King Cobra. To save Diamondback, Black Mamba and Asp called in a favor from their former leader, Sidewinder, also Black Mamba's ex-boyfriend and they rescued Diamondback, however in retaliation, King Cobra captured the Asp and Black Mamba. Diamondback then hired Paladin to help her free the pair. Together, with Captain America, and Paladin, the five combined to defeat the Serpent Society.

Band of the Bland
The Band of the Bland is a group of mediocre super villains that came together to assassinate Howard the Duck. It consists of Black Hole, Doctor Angst, Spanker, and Tillie the Hun.

Bastards of Evil
The Bastards of Evil are a team of supervillains appearing in American comic books published by Marvel Comics.

The Bastards of Evil are young supervillains who claim to be the disavowed children of some of the supervillains. They consist of Aftershock, (who claims to be Electro's daughter), Ember (who claims to be Pyro's son), Mortar (who claims to be Grey Gargoyle's daughter), Singularity (who claims to be Graviton's son), and Warhead (who claims to be Radioactive Man's son). They came together not only to rob a bank but to come up with plans to take over the world. The Bastards of Evil committed acts of terrorism and recorded it with floating robotic cameras. Warhead destroyed a part of Ohio which Gravity stopped, but Warhead escaped. The Bastards of Evil end up running afoul of the Young Allies. During the fight, Warhead exploded on Ground Zero (the former site of the World Trade Center) presumably killing himself and thousands of bystanders.

The Bastards of Evil meet up with their mysterious benefactor. When Firestar and Gravity fight Electro, he ends up defeating them. He let them live so that they can spread the message that he doesn't endorse Aftershock and the Bastards of Evil's terrorism. Electro also says that they should look up how and when he got his powers on the internet and there no way a girl of Aftershock's age could have been conceived after he got his powers. It's impossible for him to be Aftershock's father.

Aftershock informs the Bastards of Evil that they have orders from their superior to Araña and Nomad. When Firestar and Gravity arrive at the edge where Warhead exploded, they are ambushed by the Bastards of Evil. During the Young Allies' fight with the Bastards of Evil, the Young Allies end up meeting their leader who calls himself Superior and claims to be the son of the Leader.

It is soon revealed during the battle that the other Bastards of Evil members were originally teenagers who were kidnapped by Superior, exposed to various forms of radiation, given personal narrative implants, and false memories of their forgotten childhood as the children of those supervillains. When Araña and Nomad are kidnapped, the Bastards of Evil plot to kill them on national television. When the Young Allies arrived and convinced the Bastards of Evil members to in-fight themselves, Aftershock remembers her true identity of Danielle Blunt and causes her to attack Singularity who remembers his true identity of Devin Touhy. Singularity turns on Superior while the other Bastards of Evil members question their true identities. This gave the Young Allies the opportunity to defeat them after Superior uses his telekinetic abilities to rip Singularity in half. Superior and the remaining Bastards of Evil were incarcerated at the Raft. While in his cell, Superior plans to find a way to escape incarceration, wipe the memories of the remaining Bastards of Evil, and create "new siblings" to serve him.

During the "Fear Itself" storyline, Aftershock and Ember were seen escaping from the Raft after Juggernaut in the form of Kuurth: Breaker of Stone leveled it. Both were fighting against the students and teachers from the Avengers Academy alongside Icemaster, but were subdued by Jeremy Briggs.

Battalion
The Battalion is Arkansas' sanctioned superhero team that's part of the Fifty-State Initiative. Tigra is a known member of this group. Razorback was revealed to be a Skrull infiltrator.

Batroc's Brigade
Batroc's Brigade is a supervillain team assembled by Batroc the Leaper.

Beta Flight

Beyond Corporation

Beyonders

Big Hero 6

Big Hero 6 is Japan's sanctioned superhero team.

Black Air

Black Cat's Gang

Black Panthers

Black Brigade unit

Black Spectre

The Blood
The Blood are a mysterious race who allegedly supplied the first Earth-born Sorcerer Supreme over 20,000 years ago. Also attempted to separate Johnny Blaze and Danny Ketch to prevent them from knowing they were family and utilizing their powers together, but failed. Its most notable member is The Caretaker.

The Blood in other media
In the Marvel Cinematic Universe show Helstrom, The Blood represented by Caretaker/Henry, is an ancient organization that has been hunting demons for years. While they are a secret group, the Catholic Church knows they exist and turns a blind eye to their doings. In this case, they were supposed to kill Ana and Daimon Helstrom when they were children to prevent them from becoming too powerful as adults.

Bogatyri
The Bogatyri is a group of Russian superhumans that wanted to avenge Russia's defeat during the Cold War. They were named after the Valiant Champions of Elder Days in Russian folklore and consist of Svyatogor, Mikula Golubev, Doctor Vladimir Volkh, and Zvezda Dennista.

Bozanian Beast Fighter (Ragnarok)

Britannia Project

The Britannia Project is a superhero organization led by Steven Darwin. The Britannia Project was first introduced in The Union #1.

Brotherhood of Badoon
See Badoon

Brotherhood of Mutants

Brute Force
Brute Force is a team consisted of eco-sensitive animals who were imbued with the ability to speak and powered armor that gave them special powers by their benefactor Dr. Randall Pierce as part of Weapon II. They consist of a bald eagle named Soar who can transform in a fighter jet, a grizzly bear named Wreckles who can transform into a tank, a lion named Lionheart who can transform into a motorcycle, a kangaroo named Hip-Hop who can transform into an ATV, and a dolphin named Surfstreak who can transform into a race car. Together they fought injustices that were mostly eco-terrorist related such as protecting the rain forests.

Buckies
The Buckies are a group of urban commandos.

C

Cabal

Cadre K

Called
The Called is Utah's sanctioned superhero team that's part of the Fifty-State Initiative. It consists of some unnamed Mormon superheroes.

Captain Britain Corps

Carnage Family

Cat People
The Cat People are a race of humanoid felines that are associated with Tigra. The first Cat People were created from ordinary house cats by a medieval sorcerer named Ebrok. Though the Cat People were initially welcomed into Ebrok's community as warriors and domestic servants, their fierce nature as well as their rapid breeding rate soon started to become uncontrollable and the Cat People were banished to another dimension by Ebrok's fellow sorcerers. The sorcerers also installed a magick ensuring that Ebrok's original cats-into-cat people spell would never work again.

Cavalry
The Cavalry is Georgia's sanctioned superhero team that's part of the Fifty-State Initiative. Known members are Stunt-Master, Crime-Buster, Red Nine, Thor Girl (revealed to be a Skrull imposter), and Ultra Girl.

Celestials

Cerebro's X-Men

Champions
There are two versions of the Champions:

Champions (1975 team)

Champions (2016 team)

Champions of Xandar
The Champions of Xandar banded together to safeguard the four-sectioned world of Xandar in the Andromeda Galaxy from all threats to its security. The Champions coordinated Xandar's space militia, the Nova Corps, a standing army of 500 soldiers, and its special Syfon Warrior regiment. Most of the Champions were killed fighting the forces of Nebula and the team disbanded.

Charter

Chaste

Cherubim

Children of the Vault

China Force

Church of Humanity

Circle

Circuits Maximus

Circus of Crime
The Circus of Crime is the name of several supervillain organizations appearing in American comic books published by Marvel Comics. The villains have battled Hulk, Spider-Man, and Kid Colt. The original group included the Ringmaster, Blackwing, the Clown, Fire-Eater, the Great Gambinos, Human Cannonball, Live Wire, Rajah, Bruto the Strongman and Teena the Fat Lady. The Circus of Crime first appeared in The Incredible Hulk #3 (September 1962) and was created by Stan Lee and Jack Kirby.

Clan Akkaba

Clan Boudreaux

ClanDestine

Code: Blue

Cognoscenti

Comedy Kids
The Comedy Kids are three kids (Gabby, Muscles, and Junior) who appear in Comedy Comics #9.

Command
The Command is Florida's sanctioned superhero team that's part of the Fifty-State Initiative. Its known members are Jennifer Kale, Wundarr the Aquarian, Siege, and Conquistador (who was briefly replaced by a Skrull infiltrator).

Commission on Superhuman Activities

Committee

Conspiracy

Contingency

Corporation

Council of Godheads

The Council of Godheads is a gathering of all the leaders of the Pantheons.

Council of Godheads in other media
The Council of Godheads appears in Thor: Love and Thunder.

Council of the Chosen

Counter Force

C.R.A.D.L.E.
Short for Child-Hero Reconnaissance and Disruption Law Enforcement, C.R.A.D.L.E. has been established to stop the teenage superheroes from violating the Underage Superhuman Warfare Act (AKA Kamala's Law). Known members are Dum Dum Dugice, Speedball, and Timeslip.

Craptacular B-Sides

Crazy Eight

Creators
The Creators were a league of sorcerers from various time periods, some from at least as far back as the Pre-Cataclysmic era. Backed by the power of the In-Betweener, the Creators temporarily took control of the universe by transforming themselves into stars in an attempt to control the entire universe, and forcing the real stars into human forms. All was set right again by Doctor Strange and the Ancient One.

Crew

Chronok
The villain Chronok stole Reed Richards' time machine, comes to the present and kills almost all of Marvel's heroes.

Cross Technological Enterprises

Crusaders

D

Dark Advanced Tech

Daily Bugle

Daily Globe

Damage Control

Dark Avengers

Norman Osborn formed his own version of the Avengers during the "Dark Reign" storyline called the Dark Avengers.

Dark Guard

Dark Lords

Dark Riders

Dark X-Men

Norman Osborn formed his own version of the X-Men during the "Dark Reign" storyline called the Dark X-Men.

Darkhold Redeemers

Daughters of Liberty
The Daughters of Liberty are a group of females that are determined to protect the freedom of everyone at all costs. Harriet Tubman was the leader of one incarnation under the name of Dryad. In the present, Dryad is a revived Peggy Carter and the present day Daughters of Liberty consist of Agatha Harkness, Black Widow, Invisible Woman, Mockingbird, Sharon Carter, Spider-Woman, Shuri, and White Tiger.

Daughters of the Dragon

Dawn of the White Light
The Dawn of the White Light is a Japan-based mutant death-cult led by the Gorgon. The cult forms an alliance with the Hand and HYDRA and together they turn superhumans to brainwashed assassins. The brainwashed X-Man Northstar then becomes the leader of the Dawn of the White Light and they go on a killing spree in America. Wolverine and some Sentinels then destroy the cult.

Deadpool Corps

Death Commandos

Death Squad
The Death Squad are hired by a mysterious employer who wants Tony Stark, the armored Avenger known as Iron Man, dead. They manage to track Iron Man down at his main office, and a battle began. Though they gave Stark a good run for his money, they were not able to defeat the super-hero. Stark is about to defeat the entire group, but they manage an escape. Stark is unable to give pursuit, as the Death Squad had damaged his armor's boot jets. Later, the Death Squad decide to give the murder attempt another try. They assist their employer (Justin Hammer) in the murder of several ionically powered beings and in the graverobbing of several of Stark's old acquaintances. S.H.I.E.L.D. leader Nick Fury informs Stark about this and he investigates the matter, with the trail eventually leading toward the Death Squad, who were hiding out at the old castle of the ionically powered long-time Avengers foe Count Nefaria. Nefaria is revealed to be their employer. Iron Man manages to defeat Nefaria and his other minion, Nitro. In the heat of battle, the Death Squad again manages to escape.

Death-Throws

Death Web
The members of Death Web were granted super powers by the Commission on Superhuman Activities with the intent that they use their powers to serve the government. The team's individual members each obtained their unique powers through the scientific manipulation of chemicals extracted from exotic plants from the Amazon jungle.

Decepticons

Deep Six
There were two different incarnations of the Deep Six:

Namor's Deep Six
When Namor the Sub-Mariner was missing and framed for crimes in the surface world, several of his Atlantean allies set out to find him together as the first Deep Six. The impromptu group consisted of Stingray, Andromeda, Tiger Shark, Tamara Rahn, and Triton. They battled against the Avengers and then broke up shortly thereafter.

Attuma's Deep Six
Alternatively, Attuma's incarnation of the Deep Six appeared in The Defenders (vol. 2) #7 (September 2001). Membership of the group included Attuma, Nagala, Orka, Piranha, Sea Urchin, and Tiger Shark (now a villain again).

Defenders

Defenders of the Deep
In order to protect the oceans, Namor forms the Defenders of the Deep with Tiger Shark, Orka, Andromeda, Echidna, the Piranhas, Fathom Five members Bloodtide and Manowar, and King Crab as its members.

Delta Network
The Delta Network, also referred to as the Delta Force (no relation to the real life Delta Force) was the name of a group of Deviants, a fictional race of beings from Marvel Comics. The Delta Network was a group of Deviant warriors who were organized by Warlord Kro. When the Avengers were captured by the Deviant priesthood, Kro called the members into action to rescue them.

Demi-Men

Demons

Department H

Department K

Desert Stars
The Desert Stars are Arizona's sanctioned superhero team that are part of the Fifty-State Initiative. It consists of Two-Gun Kid, Komodo, Johnny Cool, and Supermax. Blacksmith was revealed to be a Skrull infiltrator.

Desert Sword
Desert Sword was designed to be Iraq's personal superhuman military team, led by Sirocco. The original team's roster included Sirocco, Aminedi, the Veil, and Black Raazer until Iraq forced Arabian Knight onto the team.

Deviants

Diabolical Duo

Doctor Doom's Generals

Dominus' Minions
Dominous employed a number of minions to contend with the costumed champions who opposed its attempts to conquer the Earth. One of them was Sunstroke, a human being. The others were sentient beings created from lizards ("Gila"), cacti ("Cactus"), and rocks ("Butte") by means of the robot's alien technology. Dominus was able to create duplicates of each of the three artificially created beings.

DP 7

E

Earth Force
The Earth Force is a group of hospitalized people that were transformed by Seth. It consists of Earth Lord (created from a police officer who was hospitalized after being shot by criminals), Skyhawk (created from a businessman who was hospitalized from overwork), and Wind Warrior (created from a housewife who was hospitalized following a suicide attempt).

Elder Gods
The elder gods are the oldest of Earth's deities, namely Set, Chthon, and Gaea.

Elders of the Universe

Elementals

Elementals of Doom
Four giant personifications of Air, Water, Earth and Fire and referred to as such. They were created by Diablo through the use of the Tailsmans of Power to battle the Fantastic Four. He later created a fifth member called the Trans-Mutant who had the ability to transform the composition of one object to another. Diablo later combined all four Elementals into the Elematrix.

Elements of Doom
The Elements of Doom are a group consisting of numerous humanoid beings composed of the periodic table. They were created by aliens to battle the Avengers, but were all defeated. They were then recruited by Diablo after his Elementals of Doom were destroyed.

Emissaries of Evil

Enchanters Three

Enclave

Enforcers

Eternals

Euroforce

Euro-Trash

Excalibur

Exemplars

Exiles

Externals

F

Factor Three
Factor Three is a short-lived supervillain team led by the Mutant Master, who was secretly an alien from a race of beings from Sirius that resemble octopuses.

Fallen Angels

Fangs
The Fangs are a group that was created to assist Viper in her goals. Its members are Bludgeon, Heat-Ray, Razorblade, and Slither.

Fantastic Five

Fantastic Force

Fantastic Four

Fathom Five
The Fathom Five is an Atlantean splintered military group with goals to decimate the surface world and were formed by a strike force called the "Fury of the Sea". It consists of Bloodtide, Dragonrider, Llyron, Manowar, and Sea Leopard.

Fear Lords
The Fear Lords consisted of seven demons -- D'Spayre, Dweller-in-Darkness, Kkallakku, Lurking Unknown, Nightmare, Nox, and Straw Man—who conspired to conquer and rule the Earth through fear.  They were opposed by Daredevil and Doctor Strange, and Straw Man (who betrayed them).

Fearsome Four

Femizons

Femme Fatales

FIRM

First LineFirst Line is first seen in Marvel: The Lost Generation - Essentially a retcon to fill the gaps caused by Marvel's "sliding timescale", in which the emergence of major superheroes and events was only supposed to have occurred "about ten or fifteen years ago"

FlashmobFlashmob is an organization of street criminals that were originally formed to attack Power Man. It consists of Nightshade, Chemistro III, Cheshire Cat, Comanche, Dontrell "Cockroach" Hamilton, Mr. Fish II, and Spear.

Flight

Folding Circle

Followers of the Light

Force Four

Force of NatureForce of Nature is an eco-terrorist group that work for the organization Project Earth. Known members are Aqueduct, Firebrand, Firewall, Skybreaker, Sunstreak, and Terraformer.

Force Works

Forgotten

Freedom's Brigade

Freedom's FiveFreedom's Five is a World War I team featuring Union Jack, Phantom Eagle, Sir Steel, Silver Squire and Crimson Cavalier.

Freedom Force

Friends of Humanity

Frightful Four

Future Foundation

G
Galactic Guardians

Gamma Corps

Gamma Flight

Garrison
The Garrison is Vermont's sanctioned superhero team that's part of the Fifty-State Initiative. Its known members are Fin and Man-Eater.

Gatherers

Gene Nation

Generation X

Genetix

Goblin Nation
The Goblin Nation, also known as the Goblin Underground, is a group of organized crime composed of Goblin-themed villains led by the Goblin King against the Superior Spider-Man (Doctor Octopus' mind in Spider-Man's body).

Goblin Nation in other media
The Goblin Nation appears in the Spider-Man episode "Goblin War". This incarnation consists of various Goblin clans led by Silvermane, Electro and Crossbones respectively with the Vulture operating as the Goblin King.

Godzilla Squad
The Godzilla Squad was formed to study Godzilla, ideally by capturing him, and preventing injury both to and by him. It was funded and partially controlled by S.H.I.E.L.D., with technology—such as the Red Ronin mecha—constructed by Stark International. S.H.I.E.L.D. agents attached to the Godzilla Squad included Dum Dum Dugan, Jimmy Woo, and Gabe Jones. The group was occasionally aided by the Avengers (particularly Henry Pym), the Fantastic Four (particularly Reed Richards), and Spider-Man. The organization was frequently opposed by Doctor Demonicus.

Grapplers

Great Beasts

Great Lakes Avengers

Green Cross

Green SpringsGreen Springs is a company that was started by Abomination that creates gamma mutates. Outside of gaining former Weapon X scientist Dr. Aliana Alba as an employee, Abomination had Green Springs repower Hulk's son Skaar.

Guardians of the Galaxy
There were two versions of the Guardians of the Galaxy:

Guardians of the Galaxy (1969 version)

Guardians of the Galaxy (2008 version)

Guardsmen

Gunhawks

H
Haazareth Three
The Haazareth Three are a trio of demons that operate out of the hellish realm ruled by Mephisto.

H.A.M.M.E.R.

Hand

Harriers
The Harriers are a team of mercenary soldiers, trained and equipped to battle both conventional and superhuman opponents. The organization consists of a military-style unit headed by the commanding officer, Hardcase, and nine other members. Each of the Harriers formerly served as an agent of the international law enforcement agency S.H.I.E.L.D. When the original version of S.H.I.E.L.D. was disbanded, these ten former S.H.I.E.L.D. banded together as the Harriers. The Harriers's last known base of operations was Colbert Chu's warehouse, Street of the Stunted Dog, Lowtown, Madripoor. Hardcase, Battleaxe, and Shotgun took an assignment from the DEA to infiltrate General Nguyen Ngoc Coy's organization in a failed attempt to destroy Coy's major opium crop in the Indochinese "Golden Triangle." During this operation, the Harriers clashed with Wolverine. The Harriers were later hired by Wolverine to try to capture him, Psylocke, and Jubilee as a test of the Harriers's skills.

Harvesters
The Harvesters are Kansas' sanctioned superhero team that's part of the Fifty-State Initiative. Its known members are Pioneer, Grain Belt, Topeka, Meadowlark, and Sunflower.

H.A.T.E.

Headmen

Heavy Hitters
The Heavy Hitters are Nevada's sanctioned superhero team that's part of the Fifty-State Initiative. Known members are Gravity, Hardball, Nonstop, Prodigy, and Telemetry.

Heavy Metal
There are two different versions of Heavy Metal:

Heavy Metal (Androids)Heavy Metal is a group of androids consisting of Super-Adaptoid, Machine Man, Awesome Android, Sentry-459, and TESS-One.

Heavy Metal (Brute Force villains)Heavy Metal is a group of cybernetic animals that were created by Multicorp to fight the Brute Force. It consists of a gorilla named Uproar, a rhinoceros named Ramrod, a shark named Bloodbath, a vulture named Tailgunner, and an octopus named Armory.

Heavy MettleHeavy Mettle is a supervillain group that was founded by Joseph Manfredi.

Heliopolitans

Hell-lords
Hell is broken into several smaller kingdoms ruled over by entities who are generally at odds with each other. Most of these entities are devils and those considered powerful enough to be the strongest rulers in Hell are referred as the Hell-lords. Those who currently and have previously borne this identification are:

 Asmodeus Aqquoonkagua Baphomet Beelzeboul Belasco Blackheart Hela Daimon Hellstrom Krampus Lucifer Marduk Kurios Mephisto Murray Olivier Pluto Satana Hellstrom Stonecold Strong Guy Umar Thog the Nether-Spawn - Thog is a demon from the extra-dimensional world of Sominus who has clashed with the Man-Thing.
 Kx'ulthuum Johnny Blaze XuthlAlthough Hela and Pluto could claim the title of Hell-lords, because they also rule in other nether realms, some readers have referred to them instead as Death-Gods.

Hell's BellesHell's Belles is a team is composed of female mutant terrorists. They were formed by Cyber to commit acts of extortion, and worked for a notorious drug cartel.

Hellfire Club

Hellbent

Hellions

Heralds of Galactus

Heroes for Hire

Hood's Gang

HordecultureHordeculture is a group of agrochemists, biotechnologists, and bioengineers consisting of Augusta Bromes, Lily Leymus, Edith Scutch, and Opal Vetiver. Specializing in the genetic manipulation and propaganda of plant life, they plan to depopulate the human race so that they can return Earth to what they consider a "more pristine state".

Horsemen of Apocalypse

Hounds

Howling Commandos

Hulk Gang
In the life of Old Man Logan, its incarnation of Bruce Banner got overloaded gamma radiation and was driven insane enough to impregnate She-Hulk. As a result, over time while claiming the West Coast of the United States as his domain after overthrowing Abomination, Hulk's hillbilly grandchildren helped to form the Hulk Gang where they acted as landlords to those that live in the rebranded part of the United States called Hulkland. In addition, they reside in a series of caves and trailers. The Hulk Gang beat or killed anyone who did not pay their rent on time.

There were two versions of the Hulk Gang in the similar Earths:

Hulk Gang (Earth-807128)
Hulk Gang members Bobbie-Jo Banner, Charlie Banner, and Otis Banner beat up Logan and will inflict more pain on him if he did not pay double by next month. As Logan was with Hawkeye to obtain the money, the Hulk Gang got tired of waiting and killed Logan's family. Upon returning and finding his family dead, Logan was informed of what happened by his neighbor Abraham Donovan causing Logan to bring out his claws for the first time. Logan proceeded to hunt down and kill the Hulk Gang members Beau Banner, Bobbie-Jo Banner, Charlie Banner, Elrod Banner, Eustace Banner, Luke Banner, Otis Banner, and Rufus Banner where he killed them. When he made his way to Pappy Banner who admitted that he got tired of being a supervillain landlord and wanted to fight Logan for old time sake by having his family killed, Logan engaged him in his Hulk form in battle and emerged as the victor. He spared Billy-Bob Banner and took custody of Hulk's infant son Bruce Banner Jr.

Hulk Gang (Earth-21293)
The Hulk Gang's history was the same here. Sometime after Pappy Banner's death and the deaths of Beau Banner, Bobbie-Jo Banner, Charlie Banner, Elrod Banner, Eustace Banner, Luke Banner, Otis Banner, and Rufus Banner, the remaining Hulk Gang members Beau Banner II, Billy-Bob Banner, Bobbie Sue Banner, Bodean Banner, Buck Banner, Cambria Banner, Clystine Banner, Horace Banner, Jackson Banner, Jefferson Banner, Jewel Banner, Jozelle Banner, Malakai Banner, Merle Banner, and Virgil Banner were gathered by an unidentified version of Maestro who he plans to make a paradise for the Hulk Gang on Earth-616. With help from the Cambria Banner who defected to their side, Logan and Hawkeye of Earth-616 were able to defeat Maestro and the surviving members of the Hulk Gang went their separate ways.

Hulkbusters

Humanity's Last Stand

Hydra

Hydro-Men
These characters, created by Bill Everett, Steve Gerber and Win Mortimer first appeared in Sub-Mariner #61 (May 1973). The Hydro-Men is an organization led by fanatical scientist Herman Frayne who used mutagenic Terrigen Mist to transform himself into a green, scaly-skinned humanoid. He took the name of Doctor Hydro. He also transformed his hired agents into Hydro-Men as well.

Hyperkind

I
Illuminati

Imperial Guard

Infinity Watch

Inhumans

Initiative

Institute of Evil

The Institute of Evil was a group of the Squadron Supreme's arch-foes. They were brainwashed to not be evil and became members of the Squadron.

IntelligenciaIntelligencia is a group that consists of the greatest criminal minds on Earth. Its known members are Leader, MODOK, Mad Thinker, Red Ghost, and Wizard. Doctor Doom and Egghead were shown as former members.

Intelligencia in other mediaIntelligencia appears in the Marvel Cinematic Universe series She-Hulk: Attorney at Law. This version of the group is run by Todd Phelps / "HulkKing" and serves as a hate group bent on obtaining a sample of She-Hulk's blood to become Hulks themselves and ruining her reputation. After She-Hulk complains to K.E.V.I.N. about the confusing plotlines in the season finale, the Intelligencia members are arrested.

Intruders

The Intruders are an elite offshoot of the Wild Pack.

Invaders

Inner Circle

J
Jack O'Lanterns
The Jack O'Lanterns are a group of mercenaries led by the Steven Mark Levins version of Jack O'Lantern who wear the same costumes and wield the same equipment of Jack O'Lantern. They fought Spider-Man and Teresa Parker when they tried to capture Chameleon at the time when he was going to sell the Infinity Formula to Foreigner.

Foreigner later deployed the Jack O'Lanterns when he persuaded Chance into partaking in a bet to obtain Spider-Man's web-shooters. They were successful in their mission.

When four of the Jack O'Lanterns turned out to be sleeper agents working for Finisher and Chameleon after the Catalyst was obtained from Empire State University, they tried to steal the Catalyst and the Clairvoyant for Finisher. Levins helped to contain the rampage by fighting the Jack O'Lanterns.

Jury

K
Kid Commandos

Killraven's Freemen

Knights of Pendragon

Knights of Wundagore

Kree Sentries

L
Lady Liberators

Landau, Luckman, and Lake

Lava Men

League of Losers
The League of Losers are a superhero from Earth-6215 that opposes the time-traveling Chronok. They consist of that world's version of Dagger, Darkhawk, Gravity, Speedball, Sleepwalker, Terror, and X-23.

Leatherneck Raiders

Lebeau Clan

Legion Accursed
During the "Secret Wars II" storyline, the Legion Accursed was formed when Mephisto sent his minion Bitterhorn to recruit 99 supervillains in his plot to steal the Beyonder's powers. The villains have included but are not limited to Abomination, Absorbing Man, Anaconda, Baron Mordo, Batroc the Leaper, Blastaar, Crimson Dynamo, Diablo, Doctor Doom, Doctor Octopus, Electro, Graviton, Hobgoblin, Juggernaut, Kang the Conqueror, Kraven the Hunter, Living Laser, Mole Man, Rhino, Silver Samurai, Titania, Ultron-11, Vanisher, Vulture, White Queen, Wizard, and Wrecker. The Legion Accursed was enchanted to send his powers into Mephisto's device called the Beyondersbane when they touched him. Upon seeing Beyonder about to leave the Pacific island he was living on, Mephisto had Thing sign a contract to make him stronger by the time the Legion Accursed was awakened. When the Legion Accursed attacked, Thing fought defeated most of them and even held back Juggernaut. This fight caused the Beyondersbane to malfunction. As a result, Mephisto ended his plot and sent the villains back to where he got them from.

Legion of Monsters

Legion of Night

Legion of the Unliving

Lemurians

Lethal Legion

Leviathan

Liberteens

The Liberteens are Pennsylvania's sanctioned superhero team that's part of the Fifty-State Initiative.

Liberty Legion

Livewires

Living Erasers

Lizard Men
There are different types of Lizard Men in Marvel Comics:

 Lizard Men of Subterranea
 Lizard Men of Subterranea
 Lizard Men of Tok

Lodge

The Lookups
The Lookers are a support group started by Edwin Jarvis for those who are associated with superheroes. It was funded by Tony Stark who uses his technology to make its members anonymous to one another. While Mary Jane Watson is clearly shown to be a member, the rest are implied to be Foggy Nelson, Ganke Lee, Peggy Rae Burdick, Pepper Potts, Carlie Cooper, and Willie Lumpkin.

Loners

Lost Souls

Lunataks

M
Maelstrom's Minions

Maggia

Magistrates
The Magistrates are a fictional police force that operate in the fictional nation of Genosha.

Mandroids

Mannites

Marauders

Masters of Evil

The Mavericks
The Mavericks are New Mexico's sanctioned superhero team that's part of the Fifty-State Initiative. Its known members are Annex, Geiger, and Jocasta. She-Thing was revealed to be a Skrull imposter.

Mega Morphs

Menagerie
The Menagerie is a team of animal based villains led by White Rabbit. The lineup consisted of her, Hippo, Gypsy Moth (who had recently changed her name to Skein) and newcomer Panda-Mania. Despite Spider-Man having his clothes torn apart by Skein, he managed to defeat the quartet before fleeing back to his apartment to change. They next appeared trying to rob a bank when Spider-Man, who had gone on a desperate search to return a lost cellphone, gets sidetracked and beats and webs up the crew in a matter of seconds before continuing his search. The Menagerie returned once again with new members Swarm, Ox, and Squid joining the roster. They attempt to rob a night club that was specifically chosen by Cassandra Lang for Nadia van Dyne, the new Wasp, when she learned that she had never gone clubbing before and that she never had a team up. With Viv Vision's help, Lang managed to ensure that the Young Avengers and the Champions would be there as well for Nadia's birthday so that they can have an all-out brawl with the villains.

Mercs for Money

MI-13

Micronauts

Midnight Sons

Midnight Wreckers
The Midnight Wreckers are a group of scavengers who allied with Dr. Peter Spaulding and Willie "Gears" Garvin during the robot revolution. They consist of Hassle, Bags, and Swift.

Mighty Avengers

Mindless Ones

Minions of Menace

Monster Hunters

Morlocks

Mutant Liberation Front

Mys-Tech

Myrmidons

N
N'Garai
The N'Garai are a race of demons created by Chthon, and have come into conflict with the Midnight Sons, the Hulk, and the X-Men. The N'Garai are ruled by Kierrok the Damned.

Nasty Boys

National Force

Neo-Knights

New Avengers

New Canaanites

New Enforcers
After the fall of Kingpin, the New Enforcers were one of the groups contesting for control of the remains of his empire. The New Enforcers' inner circle consists of Controller, Fixer, Madame Menace, Mentallo, and Mister Fear while their outer circle consists of Blitz, Dragon Man, Dreadnought, Eel, Plantman, a Super-Adaptoid, Tangle, Thermite, and Vanisher.

New Immortals
The New Immortals are a group of characters created by the High Evolutionary to make his own race of immortals. They consist of Nobilus (who was created from Thor's DNA taken from his shaved beard), Juvan, and Zon. While Recorder #211 was rebuilt into Analyzer to work with the group, New Men member Count Tager became a member of the group after subjecting himself to the Pool of Knowledge.

New Intelligencia
The New Intelligencia is an incarnation of Intelligencia consisting of MODOK Superior, Leader, Mad Thinker, Awesome Android, and Mister Sinister.

New Invaders

New Men

New Mutants

New Warriors

New X-Men

Nextwave

Neyaphem

Nick Fury's Howling Commandos

Night Shift

Nightstalkers

Norns

Nova Corps

O
O-Force
The O-Force is a superhuman team created for a reality television show where mutants compete for a place in the O-Force team. Its known members include Obituary, Ocean, Ocelot, Oink, Ooze, Optoman, Oracle, Orbit, Orchid, Orifice, and Overkill while Ozone was a wannabe member who was rejected.

Octessence
The Octessence is a fictional group made up of eight great mystical entities consisting of Balthakk, Cyttorak, Farallah, Ikonn, Krakkan, Raggadorr, Valtorr and Watoomb who gathered to determine who amongst them was most powerful.  To this end, they created the Exemplars.

Office of National Emergency

Offenders
The Offenders are a short-lived team meant to serve as an anti-Defenders group formed by the Collector and consisting of Red Hulk, Baron Mordo, Tiger Shark, and Terrax.

Offenders in other media
Hulu intended to air an animated special called The Offenders: Giant Sized Man-Thing with the titular team, consisting of Howard the Duck, MODOK, Hit-Monkey, Tigra, and Dazzler, going up against Man-Thing. All team members would have all had pre-established shows of their own. In January 2020, Howard the Duck and Tigra & Dazzler were shelved while M.O.D.O.K. premiered in May 2021 and Hit-Monkey premiered in November 2021.

Olympians

Omega Flight

Omega Gang

The Order

There were two different versions of The Order.

The Order (Defenders offshoot version)
This version of The Order is an offshoot of the Defenders formed by Doctor Strange, Hulk, Namor, and Silver Surfer who plotted to conquer the world in order to protect it while they were under Yandroth's curse.

The Order (Initiative version)
This version of The Order is California's sanctioned superhero team in the Fifty-State Initiative.

Outcasts
There are two different versions of Outcast.

Outcasts (Subterranea version)
The Outcasts are a fictional group of characters first appearing in Fantastic Four Annual #13 (1978). The superhuman members of the Outcasts first appeared in Marvel Treasury Edition #25 (1980) and were created by Bill Mantlo and Sal Buscema. The Outcasts subsequently appear in Rom #28 (March 1982) and Iron Man Annual #12 (1991). The Outcasts are people who are ugly, deformed, or disabled who believe themselves to be outcasts in human society and have therefore chosen to live under the Mole Man's rule in Subterranea. The Mole Man has granted superhuman powers to a number of the Outcasts. They were first used in Mole Man's fight with Kala: Mistress of the Netherworld. This conflict drew the attention of Hulk and Spider-Man which led to Mole Man and Kala calling a truce.

During the threat of the Dire Wraiths in Clairton, West Virginia, the Outcasts and other agents of the Mole Man fought against Rom until the Dire Wraiths revealed themselves. Both sides worked together against the Dire Wraiths until Rom banished them to Limbo.

In the midst of the war in Subterranea when Mole Man went missing, Kala left for the surface to find help in fighting Mole Man's forces and she ran into Iron Man. Mole Man sent the Outcasts to bring Kala back to Subterranea. In addition, the Netherworlders sought to kill Kala for her past actions. Digger and Landslide assisted Iron Man in fighting off the Netherworlders who wanted Kala to become their leader again. She turned them down as she is right now interested in finding Mole Man.

The members are:

 Boulder - Boulder has superhuman strength and durability. His current whereabouts is unknown.
 Digger - Digger can slice through most substances with his clawed hands. His current whereabouts are unknown.
 Landslide - Landslide can induce shattering internal vibrations within a person or object by touching it. This includes the ability to create earthquake tremors. His current whereabouts are unknown.
 Water Witch  - Water Witch controls water with a wand. She can also project ice, water or steam. She was briefly a member of the Femizons. Her current whereabouts are unknown.

Outcasts (Mutants version)
The Outcasts are a fictional group of mutants appearing in American comic books. They were depicted as disguised as an entertainment troupe during the Age of Apocalypse. The group includes Brute, Mastermind, Soaron, Toad, X-Man and their leader, Forge. Later recruits were Sonique and Essex. All but Sonique, Soaron and X-Man are slain by either Essex or Domino and her Marauders.

Outlaws

The Outlaws are an elite version of the Wild Pack.

P
Pacific Overlords
The Pacific Overlords is a fictional supervillain team consisted largely of humans mutated by Doctor Demonicus.

Pale Riders

Pantheon

Paragons
The Paragons are a fictional team made up of students of the Xavier Institute and are instructed by members of the X-Men. They consist of DJ, Match, Pixie, Preview, Trance, and Wolf Cub. The squad's colors are green, pink, and black. The Paragons are initially advised by original New Mutants member Wolfsbane. Wolfsbane is involved in a scandal when her romantic relationship with a student, Elixir, is brought to light. She chooses to leave before the school has a chance to fire her. Magma is assigned as the squad's new advisor.

People's Defense Force

There are two different versions of the People's Defense Force.

People's Defense Force (Belgium version)
This version of the People's Defense Force is a group of Hank Pym's enemies that operate out of the Bratislava Prison Superhuman Research Center.

People's Defense Force (China version)
This version of the People's Defense Force is China's sanctioned superhero team following the breakup of China Force.

Pet Avengers

Point Men
The Point Men are Hawaii's sanctioned superhero team that is part of the Fifty-State Initiative. Its known members are Stingray, Devil-Slayer, Star Sign, and Paydirt. Magnitude was revealed to be a Skrull infiltrator.

Power Broker Inc.

Power Elite
The Power Elite is a cabal of influential brokers that came together to strengthen the country after Hydra's brief takeover of the United States. Its known members include Thunderbolt Ross, Phil Coulson, Selene, Mayor Wilson Fisk, Norman Osborn, a resurrected Aleksander Lukin (who has the remnant of Red Skull's mind in him) and his wife Alexa, Zeke Stane, Baron Strucker, and Taskmaster.

Power Pack

Press Gang

Pride

Prime Sentinels

Project Pegasus

Project Rebirth

Project Wideawake

Psi-Force

Psionex

Purifiers

Q
Queen's Vengeance

R
Rangers

The Rangers are a superhero team that later became the sanctioned superhero team for Texas.

Ravagers
The Ravagers are a group of space pirates that are led by Yondu.

Ravagers in other media
 The Ravagers appear in the Guardians of the Galaxy.
 The Ravagers appear in the media set in the Marvel Cinematic Universe (MCU), which predates their comic book appearance. Known members include Yondu Udonta, Kraglin Obfonteri, Taserface, Starhawk, Martinex T'Naga, Charlie-27, Aleta Ogord, Krugarr, and Mainframe. Additionally, Peter Quill was formerly a member after the Ravagers abducted him as a child, though he would go on to found and lead the Guardians of the Galaxy. While the Ravagers are made up of several factions, they all follow a code of not trafficking children.
 The Ravagers appear in the live-action films Guardians of the Galaxy, Guardians of the Galaxy Vol. 2, and  Avengers: Endgame.
 Alternate timeline versions of the Ravagers appear in the Disney+ animated series What If...?. In the episode "What If... T'Challa Became a Star-Lord?", after Kraglin and Taserface accidentally abduct a young T'Challa instead of Quill, the Ravagers are restructured to behave like Robin Hood and his Merry Men and go on to recruit Thanos, Nebula, and Korath the Pursuer into their ranks. In the season one finale "What If... the Watcher Broke His Oath?", T'Challa's Ravagers battle Ego on Earth to prevent him from draining Quill of his cosmic powers, whom they later recruit.

R.C.X.

Reavers

Recorder

Redeemers

Renegades

Resistants

Revengers

Right
The Right is an anti-mutant organization founded by Cameron Hodge that first appeared in X-Factor #17 (June 1987). The Right employed commandos in high-tech flying battle suits of powered armor with machine guns, missiles, and (presumably to disturb or distract their victims) faceplates resembling a smiley face (in some sources these suits were subsequently nicknamed "Smiley-Face Battlesuits"). They also employed scientists and inventors such as Nanny and Ani-Mator. They faced off against X-Factor and the New Mutants.

Rocketeers
The Rocketeers are beings who wear special costumes with rockets on their backs, enabling the wearers to fly. The Rocketeers also fire rockets as weapons from portable launching equipment they carry. The Rocketeers' costumes and equipment were designed by the Dire Wraiths for use against the Spaceknights of Galador. The Rocketeers' costumes are, however, inferior imitations of their prototype, which was worn by the Torpedo until his death.

Roxxon Energy Corporation

Runaways

S
S-Men
The S-Men are a group of supervillains who were formed by a clone of Red Skull to serve as his version of the X-Men with the main objective to destroy mutantkind. The team is made up of people who have all suffered atrocities at the hands of mutants during their life, including those who have seen their families slaughtered by evil mutants. Its members include the Goat-Faced Girl, Dancing Water (the illegitimate daughter of Avalanche), Dangerous Jinn, Insect, Living Wind, Honest John, Mzee, and an unidentified monk. With the help of Red Skull and Arnim Zola, these people have gone through lengthy and painful genetic alterations involving mad science and magical artifacts in order to gain the powers they now possess (though some may have been born with their powers and others, such as Dancing Water, may in fact be mutants themselves). They first appeared after the Avengers vs. X-Men storyline where they attacked Rogue and Scarlet Witch near the grave of Professor X. The S-Men defeated Rogue and Scarlet Witch and managed to make off with Professor X's body while taking Rogue and Scarlet Witch as their captives. The S-Men held Rogue and Scarlet Witch as prisoners of Red Skull as he fused part of Professor X's brain with his own. Rogue managed to absorb some of Dancing Water's powers to escape and look for Scarlet Witch. Red Skull used Honest John to take the form of Odin in order to get Thor to help the S-Men attack the mutant race. Red Skull even used the Goat-Faced Girl to negate Wolverine's healing factor so that Thor can land a cataclysmic blow on him. Scarlet Witch and Havok assist Captain America in fighting Red Skull until Dancing Water got him out of there. Afterwards, Captain America and Havok search for leads on where to find Red Skull and the S-Men.

During the "AXIS" storyline, the S-Men and their ally Ahab stop Magneto when he arrives on Genosha to attack Red Skull. Havok, Rogue, and Scarlet Witch are captured by the Red Skull's S-Men and sent to his concentration camp in Genosha. In a fit of rage over finding mutants being used for freak medical experiments, Magneto kills the entire S-Men. Honest John, Dangerous Jinn, and the unnamed monk were the only survivors of the attack.

Salem's Seven

Santerians

Savage Land Mutates

Savage Six

Scarlet Knights

Scarlet Spiders (Red Team)

Scourges

Schutz Heiliggruppe

Secret Avengers

Secret Empire (organization)

Secret Warriors

Sentinels

Serpent Men

Serpent Society

Serpent Squad

Shadow Council
The Shadow Council is an organization that was founded by Aloysius Thorndrake and the Confederacy soldiers with him after they went through the Vanishing Point and came in contact with an entity called the Abyss.

Shadow Council in other media
A reimagined version of the Shadow Council appears in Avengers Assemble. This iteration of the group is a secret organization once led by Heinrich Zemo in the 1940s before it was disbanded after Captain America and Peggy Carter defeated them in Switzerland. By the present, a horde of new supervillains re-established the organization and sought to recruit more new members to acquire three Wakandan relics called the Panther's Key. The organization is led by Killmonger and consists of Ulysses Klaue, Madame Masque, Tiger Shark, Princess Zanda, M'Baku, and several Wakandan civilians.

Shadow Initiative

Shadow-X

Shadowmasters

S.H.E.

S.H.I.E.L.D.

Shock Troop

Siberforce

Sinister Six

Sinister Syndicate

Sisterhood of the Wasp
The Sisterhood of the Wasp is a group that is led by Wasp.

Sisters of Sin

Six

Six-Fingered Hand
The Six-Fingered Hand was a group of six lesser demons acting as pawns of more powerful demons, including Mephisto. The legion of demons once plotted to merge Earth and Hell, but their plan was successfully opposed by the Defenders. The six are also responsible for the creation of the Lesser Grey God, a statuette which has the power to reactivate old curses.

 Avarrish, who has also clashed with Ghost Rider (Johnny Blaze)/Zarathos.
 Fashima, who has also clashed with Ghost Rider (Johnny Blaze)/Zarathos.
 Hyppokri Puishannt, who has also clashed with Dracula.
 Unthinnk, who has also clashed with (and possessed) Man-Thing.
 Maya, the sixth and final member of the Six Fingered Hand, was actually a disguised Mephisto, who manipulated the rest of the group.

Six Pack

Skeleton Crew
The Skeleton Crew was an organization built by the Red Skull from his operatives.

Skrull Kill Krew

Slingers

Soldiers of Misfortune

The Solution

Sons of Satannish
The Sons of Satannish were a cult of sorcerers who received mystical power from Satannish.

Sons of the Serpent

The Sons of the Serpent are a subversive organization of costumed American racist super-patriots who oppose all racial, ethnic, and religious minorities.

Sons of the Tiger

Soviet Super-Soldiers

Spaceknights

Space Phantoms

Special Executive

Spider-Slayers

Spinsterhood

Spirits of Vengeance

Squadron Sinister

Squadron Supreme
There are different incarnations of the Squadron Supreme:

Squadron Supreme (Supreme Power version)

This version of the Squadron Supreme was created for the Max imprint of Marvel Comics.

Squadron Supreme of America

When the Power Elite collaborated with Mephisto, he created some simulacrums that were programmed to become the Squadron Supreme of America where they would serve as the sanctioned superhero team in the United States. Power Elite member Phil Coulson serves as their liaison to the U.S. government.

Stane InternationalStane International is the company that is run by Obadiah Stane.

Starforce

Starjammers

Stark Industries

Star Masters

S.T.R.I.K.E.

Subterraneans

Sunset Riders

Super-Axis
The Super-Axis first appear in The Invaders #40 (May 1979) and were created by Roy Thomas and Alan Kupperberg. The Super-Axis, consisting of former Invaders foes Master Man; U-Man; the original Baron Blood and Warrior Woman are gathered together in the second last issue of the title by the Japanese spy Lady Lotus. Using hypnotism to summon and control the villains, Lotus intends to use the newly formed Super-Axis to undermine the United States on the home front during World War II. Individual members initially skirmish with the Invaders, and the original Human Torch is also hypnotised. In a final battle at an amusement park, the entire Super-Axis confront the Invaders, but are defeated by the heroes' superior teamwork. The Torch also frees himself from Lotus' control, and attempts to locate the villain, who has fled. The final panels of the last issue show Lotus being warned by master villain the Yellow Claw about the dangers of overconfidence. An issue of the limited series The New Invaders reveals in flashback that U-Man raped Lady Lotus in retaliation for the mind control. Lady Lotus eventually gives birth to their child, Nia Noble.

Super Soldiers

Superguardians

Superhuman Restraint Unit

S.W.O.R.D.

T
Team X

Technet

Temploids

Teen Brigade

Ten Rings

Terrible Trio

Terror Inc.

Thieves' Guild

THEM

Thor Corps
There are two versions of the Thor Corps:

Eric Masterson's version
This version of the Thor Corps came together when Eric Masterson (who was the host of Thor at the time) united with Beta Ray Bill and Dargo Ktor to fight Zarrko after he tricked the latter into fighting Thor.

Battleworld's Thor Corps
During the "Secret Wars" storyline, there is a police force on Battleworld called the Thor Corps that enforce the laws of God Emperor Doom. King Thor serves as their lawspeaker while Thunderer Thorlief was a famous Thor Corps member.

Thunderbolts

Thunderriders

Time-Displaced X-Men

Time Variance Authority

Titanic Three

Tough Kid Squad
The Tough Kid Squad is a group of five kids (Wally and Tom Danger, Derrick Dawes, Butch, and Eagle) who appeared in Tough Kid Squad Comics #1 (March 1942)

Tracksuit Mafia
The Tracksuit Mafia (also called the Tracksuit Bros. and the Tracksuit Draculas) are a gang of non-superpowered organized criminals, so named because the eponymous athletic wear in which all of its members are seen, who serve as adversaries to Hawkeye. Created by writer Matt Fraction, they first appeared in Hawkeye (vol. 4) in 2012.

Tracksuit Mafia in other media
The Tracksuit Mafia were adapted into the 2021 Disney+ TV series Hawkeye. Its known members are Maya Lopez, Kazimierz "Kazi" Kazimierczak, Ivan, Tomas, Enrique and Dmitri.

Trash

Triumph Division
The Triumph Division is the Philippines' sanctioned superhero team where its members are familial and have been traced back for centuries. The team is led by Red Feather and its members include Anitun, Fighter One, Great Mongoose, Mighty Mother, St. George, and Wishing Man. The ones that first appear were killed by suicide bombers with Iron Man attending a private funeral for them and their successors being made public. They later gained a new member called Wave who helped the Agents of Atlas fight Queen Sindr's fire demons.

Triumvirate of Terror

Triune Understanding
The Triune Understanding is a religious cult created by Kurt Busiek for volume three of the Marvel Comics Avengers series.

True Believers

Twelve

U
U.S. Hulk Operations
Also called Shadow Base, the U.S. Hulk Operations is a United States military organization that is tasked with the job to hunt down Hulk and his allies. It is led by General Reginald Fortean. After General Fortean's Subject B form is killed, Hulk took control of the U.S. Hulk Operations.

U-Foes

U-Men

Ultimates

ULTIMATUM

Ultimate Fantastic Four

Ultimate X-Men

Ultraforce

Uncanny Avengers

Uncanny X-Force

Uncanny X-Men

Undying Ones
The Undying Ones are a fictional race of humanoid demons from another dimension. They are led by the Nameless One.

Unholy Three

Uni-Mind

Unified Thieves and Assassins Guild of New Orleans

Union

The Union is a superhero team that is led by Britannia and consists of Union Jack, Kelpie, Snakes and The Choir. The Union was introduced in The Union #1 and is part of the Britannia Project.

Unlimited Class Wrestling Federation

Upstarts

Uranians

V
V-Battalion
The V-Battalion is the name of two incarnations of a fictional secret organization composed of Golden Age superheroes and their descendants

Valkyrior

Vampiries

Vanguard

Vishanti

Vulturions

The Vulturions are a group of criminals who wield the same technology as Vulture.

W
Warbound
The Warbound are a group of gladiators from the Planet Sakaar that were gathered by Hulk. They consist of Korg, Miek the Unhived, No-Name the Brood, Hiroim the Shamed, Elloe Kaifi, and her bodyguard Lavin Skee.

Warbound in other media
 An adaption of the Warbound appears in the Hulk and the Agents of S.M.A.S.H. episode "Planet Leader." Korg and Miek appears amongst Leader's slaves while Hiroim is a mind-controlled overseer of the slaves and Elloe Kaifi was appointed to work as a handmaiden for She-Hulk. All four of them are freed from Leader's control by the Agents of S.M.A.S.H.
 The Warbound appeared in the direct-to-DVD Planet Hulk film. However, No-Name was cut out of the line up due to the time limit for the film.
 A version of the Warbound appear in Thor: Ragnarok. This version of the Warbound are gladiator warriors that are pitted against each other in games forced by Sakaar's planetary ruler Grandmaster.

Warclan

Warheads

Warriors Three

Warwolves

Watchdogs

Weapon P.R.I.M.E.

Weapon Plus

Weapon X

Weathermen

West Coast Avengers

Wild Pack

Wildboys
The Wildboys are an unruly pair of street-dwellers that enjoy committing violent acts of vandalism. They are highly formidable street-fighters and are greatly skilled in the use of knives and other conventional street hardware. When the Horsemen of Apocalypse attacked Manhattan during the events of the Fall of the Mutants and caused a blackout, a Vietnam veteran named Ammo organized a gang including the Wildboys, who looted the city. Sometime later, Typhoid Mary gathered the Wildboys together with Ammo, Bullet, and Bushwacker to attack Daredevil; the criminals beat Daredevil so badly that they nearly killed him.

Winter Guard

The Winter Guard is Russia's sanctioned superhero team.

Witches

Wolfpack
The Wolfpack are a group of five teenagers that reside in the South Bronx, in New York City. They were originally selected for their extraordinary abilities and aptitude by a retired Naval officer known only as Mr. Mack. He trained each of them separately from adolescence into their teen years in hand-to-hand combat, strategy, stealth, speed, endurance, and raw strength. When they were ready, he introduced them to each other. According to ancient legend, the Wolfpack has existed for at least two millennia, and serves as a cosmic balance to a group of mortal men completely devoid of compassion, love or charity, known as the Nine. The new Wolfpack soon began battling the forces of the Nine in the Bronx and continue to protect and patrol the Bronx, and battle the forces of The Nine. The Wolfpack appear in the House of M, as a gang of superpowered teens in the Bronx; in which Luke Cage made a treaty with the group. Members include Robbie Baldwin, Turbo, Darkhawk, Rage, Alex Power with his sister Julie and Raphael Vega, who is their leader. The team were seen later arranging a meeting with one of the Pride's kids; but this turns into a trap by Federal Agent Boom Boom, in which the Wolfpack were easily defeated by her, the Blob and Typhoid Mary. The team is apprehended and Vega surrenders. Vega, alongside Shang-Chi are charged with terrorism. The team were later freed by Luke Cage (along with the Dragons), in which they join in with the Avengers against Thunderbird's Brotherhood.

Women Warriors
The Women Warriors are Delaware's sanctioned superhero team that is part of the Fifty-State Initiative during the "Dark Reign" storyline. It consists of Asp, Black Mamba, Diamondback, Quicksand, and Skein.

World Counterterrorism Agency
The World Counterterrorism Agency (W.C.A.) is a counterterrorism organization founded by a group of ex-S.H.I.E.L.D. agents, including Mockingbird, following the events of the Secret Invasion storyline. Other members include Hawkeye and Dominic Fortune.

Wrecking Crew

X
Xavier's Security Enforcers

X-Babies

X-CellX-Cell is a group of depowered mutants who blamed the government for causing M-Day.

X-Corporation

X-Corps

X-Factor

X-Factor Investigations

X-Force

X-Men

X-Men 2099

X-Nation 2099

X-People

X-Statix

X-Terminators

X-Ternals

X-Treme X-Men

X-Treme Sanctions Executive

Y
Young Allies

Young Avengers

Young Gods
The Young Gods' are a group of twelve young human beings who were chosen by the major pantheons of Earth's goddesses to represent the finest qualities of humanity and the pinnacle of humanity's genetic potential and cultural accomplishment.

Young X-Men

Z

Zodiac

See also
List of government agencies in Marvel Comics
List of criminal organizations in Marvel Comics

References

External links
Marvel Comics official site
Groups at Marvunapp.com

 
 
Lists of Marvel Comics characters by organization